Modular capture vessels (acronym MCV) are converted oil tankers which can capture hydrocarbons or other liquid contaminations from leaking oil and gas wells in deep sea areas.  MCV's in general operate as normal oil tankers and provide capture and containment services in the event of a potential deepwater well control incident.

Typical modules
 Turret module for keeping the position
 Subsea support module for controlling the subsea equipment
 Process modules for treatment of captured hydrocarbons
 Flare module
 Offloading module for transferring the captured hydrocarbons to an attached tanker

These specialized ship types were created after the Deepwater Horizon oil spill in April 2010.

Actual application
After the Deepwater Horizon oil spill, the Marine Well Containment Company consisting of the following oil companies ExxonMobil, Chevron Corporation, ConocoPhillips, Shell Oil Company, BP, Apache Corporation, Anadarko Petroleum, BHP, Statoil and Hess was founded in order to develop an expanded containment response system to capture and contain oil in the event of a potential future underwater well control incident in the deepwater Gulf of Mexico.

References

Oil tankers